County Road 65 is a  road in Norway;  lie in Møre og Romsdal County, and  lie in Sør-Trøndelag County.

After branching off from European route E39 at Betna, the road runs southeast through Møre og Romsdal County to Skei, where it crosses the Surna River. Then it runs east along the left side of the river to Bolmen, continuing east mostly on the other side of the river to the border with Sør-Trøndelag County and on to Storås. There it takes a northeast direction along the Orkla River until rejoining European route E39 at Bårdshaug.

Until January 1, 2010 the road was a national road, but it was reclassified as a county road after regional reform. Until October 2, 2015 the section from Forve to Bårdshaug was part of European route E39, which has now been rerouted to the north.

References

External links
Statens vegvesen – trafikkmeldinger Fv65 (Traffic Information: County Road 65)

65
65